Luciana is a feminine given name of Roman origin, a variation of the masculine name Lucius. The name is especially popular in Argentina, Brazil, Italy, Portugal and Romania. In Hungarian language the name is used as Luciána.

List of people with the given name Luciana
 Luciana Abreu, Portuguese singer and actress
Luciana Arrighi, Italian production designer
 Luciana Aymar, retired Argentine field hockey player
 Luciana Berger, British politician
Luciana Borio, American physician and public health administrator
 Luciana Braga, Brazilian actress
 Luciana Caporaso, British singer
Luciana Carro, Canadian actress
Luciana Castellari, Italian sprinter
Luciana Castellina, Italian politician and journalist
Luciana Curtis, Brazilian model
Luciana Diniz, Portuguese equestrian
Luciana dos Santos, Brazilian long jumper, triple jumper and sprinter.
Luciana Duranti, Canadian professor
Luciana Maria Dionizio, Brazilian footballer
Luciana Frassati Gawronska, Italian writer
Luciana Genro, Brazilian politician
Luciana Gilli, Italian actress
 Luciana Gimenez, Brazilian fashion model and TV show hostess of Lebanese origin
Luciana Guindani, Italian canoeist
Luciana Lamorgese, Italian civil servant and politician
 Luciana Littizzetto, Italian actress
Luciana León, Peruvian politician
Luciana Masante, Argentine tennis player
Luciana Mello, Brazilian singer and professional dancer
Luciana Mendoza, Argentine handball player
Luciana Mocchi, Uruguayan singer and composer
Luciana Molina, Argentine field hockey player
Luciana Morales Mendoza, Peruvian chess player
Luciana Nascimento, Brazilian volleyball player
 Luciana Paluzzi, Italian actress
Luciana Pedraza, Argentine actress and director
Luciana Pezzoni, Italian gymnast
Luciana Popescu, Romanian handball player
Luciana Ravizzi, Argentine ballerina
Luciana Salazar, Argentine glamour model
Luciana Salvadó, Argentine handball player
Luciana Sandoval, Salvadoran television presenter
Luciana Santos, Brazilian engineer and politician
Luciana Santos de Lima, Brazilian singer and songwriter
Luciana Savignano, Italian ballerina
Luciana Sbarbati, Italian politician
 Luciana Serra, Italian soprano
 Luciana Souza, Brazilian jazz singer and composer
Luciana Tella, Brazilian tennis player
Luciana Turina, Italian singer, actress and television personality
Luciana Val, Argentine photographer

Fictional characters
 Luciana Mazzei, a fictional character from the anime/manga Strike Witches
 Luciana, the daughter of Giovani who fell in love with Erik from Susan Kay's Phantom.
 Luciana, a character in the Joseph Heller novel Catch-22
 Luciana Galvez, a fictional character from the television show Fear the Walking Dead

References

Italian feminine given names
Portuguese feminine given names
Romanian feminine given names
Spanish feminine given names